This is a list of financial institutions in Malaysia.

Central Bank
 Bank Negara Malaysia (The Central Bank of Malaysia)

Top largest banks in Malaysia

List of Malaysian banks by Total Assets as of 31 March 2020

Malaysian national nationwide banks

Commercial banks
 Affin Bank
 Alliance Bank
 AmBank
 CIMB
 Hong Leong Bank
 Maybank
 Public Bank
 RHB Bank

List of foreign banks (commercial)
List of Licensed Banking Institutions in Malaysia (commercial) in alphabetical order
 BNP Paribas Malaysia Berhad
 Bangkok Bank Berhad
 Bank of America Malaysia Berhad
 Bank of China (Malaysia) Berhad
 Bank of Tokyo-Mitsubishi UFJ (Malaysia) Berhad
 China Construction Bank (Malaysia) Berhad
 Citibank Berhad
 Deutsche Bank (Malaysia) Berhad
 HSBC Bank Malaysia Berhad
 India International Bank (Malaysia) Berhad
 Industrial and Commercial Bank of China (Malaysia) Berhad
 J.P. Morgan Chase Bank Berhad
 Mizuho Bank (Malaysia) jfifj
 OCBC Bank (Malaysia) Berhad
 Standard Chartered Bank Malaysia Berhad
 Sumitomo Mitsui Banking Corporation Malaysia Berhad
 The Bank of Nova Scotia Berhad
 United Overseas Bank (Malaysia) Bhd.

List of banks with marketing and representative offices in Malaysia
AN1142 National Bank Limited
The Bank of Tokyo-Mitsubishi UFJ Limited
The Bank of New York Mellon Limited
Credit Suisse Limited
Middle East Investment Bank LTD
DBS Bank Limited
National Australia Bank Limited
The Royal Bank of Scotland Limited
Wells Fargo Bank Limited
Zamora Trading Limited

List of offshore banks and branches in Labuan (licensed and regulated by Labuan Financial Services Authority) 

Aminternational (Labuan) Ltd (Labuan Branch)
AmMerchant Bank Berhad
Asian Trade Investment Offshore Bank (Labuan)
Bank Islam Malaysia Berhad, (Labuan Offshore Branch)
Bank Muamalat Malaysia Berhad, (Labuan Offshore Branch)
Bank of America National Association Berhad, (Labuan Branch)
The Bank of East Asia Ltd (BEA) (Labuan Branch)
The Bank of Nova Scotia (Labuan Branch)
The Bank of Tokyo-Mitsubishi UFJ Limited (Labuan Branch)
Barclays Bank PLC (Labuan Branch)
BNP Paribas (Labuan Branch)
Calyon (Labuan Branch)
Capital Investment Bank Limited (Labuan)
Cathay United Bank (Labuan)
Consolidated Credit(S)Berhad
CIMB Bank (L) Limited
Citibank Malaysia (L) Limited (Labuan)
City Credit Investment Bank Limited (Labuan)
Commercial IBT (Labuan Branch)
Credit Suisse (Labuan Branch)
DBS Bank Limited (Labuan Branch)
Deutsche Bank AG (Labuan Branch)
Dresdner Bank AG (Labuan Branch)
ECM Libra Investment Bank Limited (Labuan)
European Credit Investment Bank Ltd (ECIB)
First East Export Bank (P.L.C) (FEEBANK)
The Hong Kong and Shanghai Banking Corporation Limited Offshore Banking Unit (Labuan)
ING Bank NV (Labuan Branch)
The Mega International Commercial Bank (Labuan Branch)
J.P. Morgan Malaysia Ltd (Labuan)
J.P. Morgan Chase Bank National Association (Labuan Branch)
KBC Bank NV (Labuan Branch)
Kuwait Finance House Labuan Berhad (Labuan Branch)
Lloyds TSB Bank PLC (Labuan Branch)
Middle East Investment Bank LTD
Mizuho Bank Ltd (Labuan Branch)
Macquarie Bank Limited (Labuan Branch)
Morgan Stanley Labuan Investment Bank Limited (Labuan Branch)
Natexis Banques Populaires (Labuan Branch)
OSK Investment Bank (Labuan) Limited (Labuan)
OCBC Bank Limited (Labuan Branch)
Public Bank (L) Limited (Labuan)
Rabobank Nederland (Labuan Branch)
RHB Bank (L) Ltd (Labuan)
The Royal Bank of Scotland PLC (Labuan Branch)
RUSD Investment Bank Inc (Labuan)
Schroders Malaysia (L) Berhad (Labuan)
Societe Generale (Labuan Branch)
Sumitomo Mitsui Banking Corporation (Labuan Branch)
UBS AG (Labuan Branch)
United Overseas Bank Limited (Labuan Branch)
Industrial and Commercial Bank of China (Labuan Branch)
RM Investment Bank

Investment banking arm (wholesale banking)

Investment banks (full list)
 Affin Hwang Capital (Following merger between Affin Investment Bank and Hwang-DBS Investment Bank) 
Alliance Investment Bank Berhad
AmInvestment Bank Berhad
CIMB Investment Bank Berhad (Partnered with BDO Uni-bank as Authorized Agent Bank For International Tax Collection)
Hong Leong Investment Bank Berhad
Public Investment Bank Berhad
RHB Investment Bank Berhad
KAF Investment Bank Berhad
Kenanga Investment Bank Berhad
Maybank Investment Bank
MIDF Investment Bank Berhad
MIMB Investment Bank Berhad (merged with Hong Leong Investment Bank)
OSK Investment Bank Berhad (merged with RHB Investment Bank Berhad)
ECM Libra Investment Bank Berhad (bought over by Kenanga Investment Bank)

Merchant bank
There is none as all previous ones have been converted or merged into investment banks.

Other types of banks

18 Islamic banks (local and foreign) (full list)
Affin Islamic Bank Berhad
Al Rajhi Bank
Alkhair International Islamic Bank Malaysia jsj 
Alliance Islamic Bank Berhad
AmBank Islamic Berhad
MBSB Bank Berhad
Asia Offshore Finance Agency
Bank Islam Malaysia
Bank Muamalat Malaysia
CIMB Islamic Bank Berhad
Hong Leong Islamic Banking Berhad
HSBC Amanah Malaysia Berhad
Kuwait Finance House (Malaysia) Berhad
Maybank Islamic Berhad
OCBC Al-Amin Bank Berhad
Public Islamic Bank Berhad
RHB Islamic Bank Berhad
Standard Chartered Saadiq Berhad

Development financial institutions (government-owned banks) (full list)
Agro Bank Malaysia 
Bank Rakyat 
Bank Simpanan Nasional 
Export-Import Bank of Malaysia Berhad (Exim Bank) 
Bank Perusahaan Kecil & Sederhana Berhad ((Small Medium Enterprise) SME Bank Berhad)
Sabah Development Bank Berhad (SDB) 
Sabah Credit Corporation (SCC)
Tabung Haji 
Credit Guarantee Corporation Malaysia Berhad (CGC) 
Malaysia Debt Ventures Berhad 
Malaysian Industrial Development Finance Berhad (MIDF) 
Bank Pembangunan Malaysia Berhad (BPMB) (The development bank of Malaysia)

Discount house
There is none as all previous ones has been transformed into investment bank

Moneybrokers (full list)
Affin Moneybrokers Sdn Bhd
ICAP (Malaysia) Sdn Bhd (formerly known as Amanah Butler Malaysia Sdn Bhd)
Harlow's & MGI Sdn Bhd

Other financial institutions (full list)
ERF Sdn Bhd
Pengurusan Danaharta Nasional Berhad
Danajamin Nasional Berhad
Zamora Trust Services Sdn Bhd

List of credit cards, charge cards, debit cards and prepaid cards issuers

Credit cards issuers
Banks
Affin Bank - Mastercard and Visa
Alliance Bank - Mastercard and Visa
AmBank - Mastercard, Visa and UnionPay
Bank Islam Malaysia (i) - Mastercard and Visa
Bank Muamalat (i) - Visa
Bank Simpanan Nasional (i) - Mastercard and Visa
Bank Rakyat (i) - Mastercard
CIMB Bank - Mastercard and Visa
Citibank Malaysia(Sold to UOB Group) - Mastercard
Hong Leong Bank - Mastercard and Visa
HSBC Bank Malaysia - Mastercard and Visa
Industrial and Commercial Bank of China (ICBC) - UnionPay and Visa
Maybank - American Express, Mastercard and Visa
OCBC Bank - Mastercard
Public Bank Berhad - Mastercard and Visa 
RHB Bank - Mastercard and Visa 
Standard Chartered - Mastercard and Visa
United Overseas Bank - Mastercard and Visa
(i) denotes Islamic Only facilities.
Consumer credit providers
Æon Credit Service - MasterCard and Visa
Synergy Cards Sdn Bhd

Charge cards issuers 

* Left the Malaysian market

Malaysia debit card issuers

So far Al-Rajhi Visa card BIN allows online purchases for flights and US purchases. Restricted for non-Halal uses such as Casino, Pub etc. Can be used at Genting Resorts.
E-MasterCard is the electronic Mastercard (non-embossed). It may be personalised.
NETS is the Network for Electronic Transfer System in Singapore for EFTPOS. ATM roaming use only.
All banks are BERHAD (Public Limited Company) except Bank Rakyat and BSN which are Coop and government entities respectively.
Most mainline banks are now members of MEPS ATM. Withdrawal charges normally are about RM1 for major banks except where stated (as much as RM5 each time). All Visa card are non-embossed type except for Citibank Ready Credit accounts. Bank Rakyat, Muamalat, OCBC Bank do not co-brand their cards except for ATM use only. Maybank has the largest capitalisation in Malaysia in June 2018.

Central Bank of Malaysia expects all debit cards issued in Malaysia to be co-branded with the local network 'MyDebit' latest by the year 2017.

Prepaid card issuers 

* No longer available

Other (skl-banking) skl-owned financial related organisations
 Cagamas Berhad
 EPF - Employees Provident Funds (KWSP - Kumpulan Wang Simpanan Pekerja)
 Permodalan Nasional Berhad (PNB)
 Treasury Malaysia
 National Economic Action Council
 Labuan Financial Service Authority (Labuan FSA)
 Malaysia Deposit Insurance Corporation
 Small and Medium Industries Development Corporation (SMIDEC)
 Pengurusan Danaharta Nasional Berhad
 The Iclif Leadership and Governance Centre (ICLIF)
 Inland Revenue Board
 Bursa Malaysia (KLSE - Kuala Lumpur Stock Exchange)
 Malaysia Derivatives Exchange Berhad
 Department of Statistics
 J. D. Zamora Trust Services (International Tax Collection Agent)

Affiliates
 Institute of Bankers Malaysia
 Malaysian Insurance Institute
 Association of Islamic Banking Institutions Malaysia
 Life Insurance Association of Malaysia 
 General Insurance Association of Malaysia
 International Association of Insurance Supervisor
 Financial Mediation Bureau (FMB)
 Credit Counselling and Debt Management Agency (AKPK)
 Zamora Trading Malaysia (International Treaty Tax Authorized Collection Agent)

Other private financial institutions

Licensed Money Lenders
FK Capital Berhad
Sri Guan Teik Enterprise Sdn Bhd
Broadway money lenders
Bhera Investment Berhad
Easytop Capital Sdn Bhd
SS SIong Wang Trading SS
ACE Credit Berhad
PS Alliance Sdn Bhd
Maxmatic Capital sdn Bhd
Safe Best Enterprise Sdn Bhd
Euritage Sdn Bhd
Fullup Credit Sdn Bhd
Twomax Enterprise
First Max Enterprise
Perfect Million Capital Sdn Bhd
Everlast Enterprise
Bakti Mentari Enterprise
Money Aim Enterprise
Ultimax Management Services
Well Delight Sdn Bhd
Doritama Holding Sdn Bhd
Kenanga Capital Sdn Bhd
Fidelity Funding Sdn Bhd
Amalan Credit Corporation Sdn Bhd
Short Deposit Malaysia Private Bank Bhd
Zamora Trading Sdn Bhd
Max Loans Sdn Bhd
Kawanku Enterprise
Garnal Enterprise
Sibu Kurnia Marine Sdn Bhd / IOUpay Pty Ltd

Defunct, merged, acquired or renamed banks
ABN (M) Berhad
ABN AMRO (M) Berhad
Abrar Finance Berhad
Advance Finance Berhad
Amanah Capital Partners Berhad
Amanah International Finance Berhad
Amanah Merchant Bank Berhad
Amsterdamsche Bank (AB)
Amsterdamsche-Rotterdamsche Bank NV (AMRO)
Asia Commercial Finance Berhad (ACF Finance Berhad)
Affin Finance Berhad
Affin-ACF Finance Berhad
Affin Investment Bank Berhad
Affin Merchant Bank Berhad
Affin Motor and Credit Finance Sdn Bhd
Algemene Bank Nederland NV (ABN)
Allied Bank Berhad
Allied Finance Berhad
Alliance Finance Berhad
Alliance Merchant Bank Berhad
AmFinance Berhad
AmMerchant Bank Berhad
ANZ Banking Group Ltd 
Agra and United Service Bank Ltd
Agra and Masterman Bank Ltd
Arab Malaysian Development Bank Berhad Now merged to be AmBank Berhad
Arab Malaysian Development Finance Berhad
Arab Malaysian Finance Berhad
Arab Malaysian Merchant Bank Berhad
Arab Malaysian Bank Berhad
Arab Malaysian Industrial Finance Berhad
Arab Investment for Asia
Aseambankers Malaysia Berhad
The Asiatic Bank Corporation
Asian & Euro-American Merchant Bankers (Malaysia) Berhad
Asian International Merchant Bankers Berhad
Ban Hin Lee Bank Berhad
Bank Agong (Apex Bank)
Bank of America Asia (HK) Limited
Bank Bumiputra Malaysia Berhad  Merged with Bank of Commerce Berhad to form Bumiputra-Commerce, presently as CIMBBank Buruh Berhad
Bank Kerjasama Malaysia Berhad
Bank Oriental
Bank Negara Tanah Melayu
Bank of Canton
Bank of Commerce Berhad  Merged with Bank Bumiputra Malaysia Berhad to form Bumiputra-Commerce, presently as CIMB without Borang I & J by Court announcement holder 
Bank of Communication
Bank of Malaya
Bank of Tokyo (M) Berhad
Bank of Tokyo-Mitsubishi (M) Berhad
Bank Simpanan Pejabat POS (POSB)
Bank Persatuan Kerjasama Seberang Perai Berhad
Bank Pertanian Malaysia Berhad Currently known as AgroBank
Bank Pembangunan & Infrastruktur Malaysia Berhad
Bank Pembangunan Sabah Berhad
Bank Utama Berhad
Banque de L'Indochine (Malaysian French Bank Berhad)
Banque Indosuez
Bank Industri & Teknologi Malaysia Berhad
Bank Bumiputra Finance Berhad (BBMB Kewangan Berhad)
Batu Pahat Bank
Bian Chiang Bank Ltd
British East India Company
British North Borneo Company
Bolton Finance Berhad
Boon Siew Finance Berhad
Board of Commissioners of Currency Malaya
The Board of Commissioners of Currency, Malaya and British Borneo
Borneo Development Corporation Sdn Bhd (Sabah)
Borneo Development Corporation Sdn Bhd (Sarawak)
BSN Commercial Bank
BSN Finance Berhad
BSN Merchant Bank Berhad
Bumiputra Commerce Bank Berhad (BCB)
Bumiputra Commerce Finance Berhad
Bumiputra Merchant Bankers Berhad
Cempaka Finance Berhad
The Chase Manhattan Bank (M) Berhad
Chartered Merchant Bankers Malaysia Berhad
Central Bank of Malaya
Chew Geok Lin Finance Berhad
The Chartered Bank of India, Australia and China (The Chartered Bank)
The Chartered Mercantile Bank of India, London and China (The Mercantile Bank)
The Chinese Commercial Bank Ltd
Chung Khiaw Bank (M) Berhad
Chung Khiaw Finance (M) Berhad
City Finance Berhad
Co-Operative Central Banks Ltd
Commercial Bank Corporation of India and the East
Commerce International Merchant Bankers Berhad (CIMB)
Commerce Tijari Bank Berhad
Credit Corporation Malaysia
D & D Finance Berhad
D & C Sakura Merchant Bankers Berhad 
Dai-Kangyo Bank (M) Berhad
Delta Finance Berhad
Delta Leasing sdn.bhd
Development & Commercial Bank Berhad (DCB Bank)
Development & Commercial Bank Finance Berhad (DCB Finance)
Edaran Otomobil Nasional Bank Berhad (EON Bank Berhad)
Edaran Otomobil Nasional Finance Berhad (EON Finance)
European Asian Bank Berhad
Federated Malay States Pos Office Savings Bank
Federal & colonial Building Society Limited
First Malaysia Finance Berhad
The First National City Bank of New York
First National City Bank
Habib Bank Ltd
Ho Hong Bank Ltd
Hock Hua Bank Berhad
Hock Hua Finance Berhad
Hong Kong Bank (M) Berhad
The Hong Kong Shanghai Banking Company Limited
Hong Leong Credit Berhad
Hong Leong Finance Berhad
Hwang-DBS Investment Bank Berhad
I.M.A.Sdn Bhd
Indian Overseas Bank Ltd
Indian Bank Ltd
Interfinance Berhad
International Banking Corporation
International Merchant Bankers Berhad
Intradagang Merchant Bankers (M) Berhad
J.P. Morgan Chase & Co.
K & N Kenanga Berhad
KCB Finance Berhad
Kewangan KGN Berhad
Kewangan Pekembarjaya Berhad
Kewangan Bersatu Berhad
Kewangan Industrial Berhad
Kewangan Usaha Bersatu Berhad
Kewangan Usahasama Makmur Berhad
Kewangan Utama Berhad
Kong Ming Bank Berhad
Kong Ming Finance Corporation Berhad
Kuala Lumpur Finance Berhad
Kwantung Provincial Bank Limited
Kwong Lee Mortgage & Remittance Company
Kwong Lee Bank Berhad
Kwong Yik Banking Company
Kwong Yik Banking Corporation
Kwong Yik Bank Berhad
Kwong Yik Finance Berhad
Lee Wah Bank Ltd
Magnum Finance Berhad
Malaya and British Borneo Currency Commission Board (MBBCCB)
Malaya Borneo Building Society Limited
Malaysia Credit Finance Berhad
Malayan Banking Corporation
Malayan United Bank Berhad
Malaysian Industrial Finance Corporation Limited
Malaysian Industrial Finance Company Limited
Malaysian International Finance Berhad
Malaysian International Merchant Bankers Berhad (MIMB)
Mayban Finance Berhad
Malayan Finance Corporation Berhad
Malayan United Industries Bank Berhad (MUI Bank)
Malayan United Industries Finance Berhad (MUI Finance)
MBF Finance Berhad
MBF Leasing Sdn Bhd
MIMB Investment Bank Berhad
Multinational Bank of United Kingdom
Multi-Purpose Bank Berhad
Multi-Purpose Finance Berhad
National Australia Bank Limited (NAB)
National Bank Of Australasia Limited (NBA)
The National City Bank of New York
National Commercial Bank
Nationale Handelsbank
Nationale Bank voor Middellang Krediet (National Bank for Medium-Term Credit)
Netherland Hondele Bank 
The Nederlandsch-Indische Handelsbank
Nederlandsche Handel-Maatschappij 
The Netherlands Trading Society
North Western Bank of India
The Oriental Bank Corporation
The New Oriental Bank Corporation Limited
Oriental Bank Berhad
Oversea-Chinese Bank Ltd
Oversea-Chinese Banking Corporation Finance (M) Berhad (OCBC Finance)
Overseas Chinese Union Bank Limited
Overseas Union Bank (M) Berhad (OUB Bank)
Overseas Union Trust (M) Berhad
P & O Banking Corporation
Pacific Development Credit Berhad
The Pacific Bank Berhad
Perak Savings Bank
Perdana Finance Berhad
Perdana Merchant Bankers Berhad
Perkasa Finance Berhad
Permata Chartered Merchant Bank Berhad
Permata Merchant Bank Berhad
Pertama Malaysia Finance Berhad
Pertanian Baring Sanwa Multinational Berhad
Petra Finance Berhad
Pewira Affin Bank Berhad
Pewira Affin Merchant Bank Berhad
Pewira Habib Bank Malaysia Berhad
Phileo Allied Bank Berhad
Phileo Allied Finance Berhad
Pos Office Savings Bank
The Province Wellesley Co-operative Banking Union Limited
Public Finance Berhad
Public Merchant Bank Berhad
Rakyat First Merchant Bankers Berhad
Rashid Hussein Bank Delta Finance Berhad (RHB Finance)
RHB Sakura Merchant Bankers Berhad
Rotterdamsche Bank NV (RB)
Sabah Bank Berhad
Sabah Finance Berhad
Sanwa Bank of Japan
Security Pacific Asian Bank Ltd
Selangor Savings Bank
Separate Savings Bank (Straits Settlement Post Office Savings Bank)
Sime Bank Berhad
Sime Darby Investment Services Ltd
Sime Finance Berhad
Sime Merchant Bankers Berhad
Southern Banking Limited
Southern Bank Berhad
Southern Finance Berhad
Southern Investment Bank Berhad
Supreme Finance Berhad
Syarikat Permodalan Kebangsaan Berhad
Sze Hai Tong Banking and Insurance Company
Tenaga Finance Berhad
Unfederated Malay States Pos Office Savings Bank
The Union Bank of Culcutta
United Asian Bank Berhad
United Commercial Bank Ltd
United Chinese Bank Ltd
United Malayan Banking Corporation Berhad (UMBC)
United Malayan Banking Corporation Finance Berhad (UMBC Finance)
United Malayan Banking Berhad
United Merchant Finance Berhad
United National Finance Berhad
Utama Merchant Finance Berhad
Utama Merchant Bank Berhad
Utama Wardley Berhad
Visia Finance Berhad
Vereenigde Oostindische Compagnie - VOC (Dutch/Netherlands East Indies-Dutch East India Company) 
Wah Tat Bank Berhad
The Yokohama Specie Bank Limited
(more to come)

Securities Commission skl related licensed intermediaries (Stock Broking related firms)

80 Licensed Fund Managers (+ Futures Fund Managers) ('full list)
Aberdeen Asset Management Sdn Bhd
Affin Hwang Asset Management Berhad
AIG Global Investment Corporation (Malaysia) Sdn Bhd
AIMS Asset Management Sdn Bhd                            (+ Futures)
Alliance Capital Asset Management Sdn Bhd                (+ Futures)
Alpha Asset MAnagement Berhad
Amanah Saham Kedah Berhad
Amanah SSCM Asset Management Sdn Bhd
AmanahRaya - JMF Asset Management Sdn Bhd                (+ Futures)
AmInvestment Management Sdn Bhd                          (+ Futures)
Apex Investment Services Berhad
Areca Capital Sdn Bhd 
ASM Investment Service Berhad
Assar Asset Management Sdn Bhd
Avenue Invest Berhad                                     (+ Futures)
Ayman Capital Sdn Bhd
BIMB Unit Trust Management Sdn Bhd
Behra Investment Berhad
BIMSEC Asset Management Sdn Bhd 
BTR Capital Partners Sdn Bhd
Bumiwerk Asset Management Sdn Bhd
The Capital Dynamics Asset Management Sdn Bhd
CIMB-Principal Asset Management Berhad                   (+ Futures)
CMS Dresdner Asset Management Sdn Bhd
Easset Management Sdn Bhd
ECM Libra capital Markets Sdn Bhd
First Bond Asset Management Sdn Bhd
Fortitude Asset Management Sdn Bhd
Fortress Capital Asset Management Sdn Bhd
Fulcrum Asset Management Sdn Bhd
Golden Touch Asset Management Sdn Bhd
Hadrons Capital Sdn Bhd
Hickham Capital Management Sdn Bhd
HLG Asset Management Sdn Bhd                             (+ Futures)
Hong Leong Fund Management Sdn Bhd
ING Funds Berhad
Inter-Pacific Asset Management Sdn Bhd
Itrinsic Capital Management Sdn Bhd
IUB Asset Management Sdn Bhd
KAF Investment Funds Berhad                    (+ Futures)
Kenanga Asset Management Sdn Bhd
Kenanga Investment Management Sdn Bhd
Kenanga Unit Trust Berhad                                 (+ Futures)
Kestrel Capital Partners (M) Sdn Bhd
KLCS Asset Management Sdn Bhd                             (+ Futures)
Kumpulan Sentiasa Cermelang Sdn Bhd                       (+ Futures)
Mayban Investment Management Sdn Bhd
Mercury Asset Management Sdn Bhd
Meridian Asset Management Sdn Bhd
Muamalat Avenue Sdn Bhd                                   (+ Futures)
Navis Management Sdn Bhd
Opus Asset Management Sdn Bhd                             (+ Futures)
OSK International Asset Management Sdn Bhd                (+ Futures)
OSK-UOB Unit Trust Management Berhad
Pacific Mutual Fund Berhad
PacificMas Asset Management Sdn Bhd
PCB Asset Management Sdn Bhd
Pelaburan Johor Berhad
Pengurusan Kumipa Berhad
Perkasa Normandy Managers Sdn Bhd
Permodalan Nasional Berhad
PFM Capital Holdings Sdn Bhd
Pheim Asset Management Sdn Bhd                            (+ Futures)
Philip Capital Management Sdn Bhd
PowerHouse Asset Management Sdn Bhd
PRB Asset Management Sdn Bhd
Premier Investment Management Sdn Bhd
Prudential Fund Management Berhad
PTB Unit Trust Berhad
Public Mutual Berhad
RHB Asset Management Sdn Bhd                              (+ Futures)
SBB Asset Management Sdn Bhd                              (+ Futures)
Singular Asset Management Sdn Bhd
SJ Asset Management Sdn Bhd
Suria Asset Management Sdn Bhd
Trillium Advisory Investment Management Berhad
UOB-OSK Asset Management Sdn Bhd
TA Asset Management Sdn Bhd (Futures only)
VCB Capital Sdn Bhd
Zamora Holdings Sdn Bhd

16 Licensed Futures Brokers (full list)
Affin Hwang Futures Sdn Bhd (formerly known as HDM Futures Sdn Bhd)
AmFutures Sdn Bhd
Apex Futures Sdn Bhd
Avenue Securities Sdn Bhd
CIMB Futures Sdn Bhd
Fedrums Sdn Bhd
Fontanazz Futures Sdn Bhd
Innosabah Options & futures Sdn Bhd
Inter-Pacific Futures Sdn Bhd
Kenanga Deutsche Futures Sdn Bhd
Okachi (Malaysia) Sdn Bhd
Oriental Pacific Futures Sdn Bhd
OSK Futures & Options Sdn Bhd
RHB Futures Sdn Bhd
Sunny Futures Sdn Bhd
TA Futures Sdn Bhd

37 Licensed Dealers (full list)
A.A.Anthony Securities Sdn Bhd (bought by UOB Kayhian)
Affin Securities Sdn Bhd
AmSecurities Sdn Bhd
Avenue Securities Sdn Bhd
BIMB Securities Sdn Bhd
CIMB Securities Sdn Bhd
CLSA Securities Malaysia Sdn Bhd
Credit Suisse Securities (Malaysia) Sdn Bhd
EONCAP Securities Sdn Bhd
FA Securities Sdn Bhd
HLG Securities Sdn Bhd
Hwang-DBS Securities Sdn Bhd
Innosabah Securities Berhad (bought by UOB Kayhian)
Inter-Pacific Securities Sdn Bhd
JF Apex Securities Berhad
JPMorgan Securities (Malaysia) Sdn Bhd
Jupiter Securities Sdn Bhd
K*N Kenanga Berhad
KAF-Seagroatt & Campbell Securities Sdn Bhd
Kuwait Finance House (Malaysia) Berhad
M&A Securities Sdn Bhd
Macquarie (Malaysia) Sdn Bhd
Malacca Securities Sdn Bhd
Malaysian Issuing House Sdn Bhd (Issuing House)
Mercury Securities Sdn Bhd
MIDF Consultancy & Corporate Services Sdn Bhd (Issuing House)
MIDF Sisma Securities Sdn Bhd
Nomura Securities Malaysia Sdn Bhd
OSK Securities Berhad
RHB Securities Sdn Bhd
SBB Securities Sdn Bhd
SJ Securities Sdn Bhd
TA Securities Holdings Bhd
UBS Securities Malaysia Sdn Bhd
UOB KAY HIAN SECURITIES (M)SDN BHD
Zamora Trading Sdn Bhd

96 Licensed Investment Advisers (+ Financial Planner) (full list)

85 Corporate

16 Individual

49 Registered Ventures Capital Corporations (full list)

42 Registered Ventures Capital Management Corporations (full list)

List of Defunct Securities Commission related licensed intermediaries
AIGIC (M) Sdn Bhd
Allied Avenue Assets Securities Sdn Bhd
Allied Philip Capital Management Sdn Bhd
AMMB asset Management Sdn Bhd
Arab Malaysian Securities Sdn Bhd
Avenue Asset Management Services Sdn Bhd
Avenue Unit Trust Berhad
CMS Dresdner Thornton Asset Management Sdn Bhd
Commerce Trust Berhad
Fima Asset Management Sdn Bhd
FOS Asset Sdn Bhd
IR Asset Management Sdn Bhd
J.B Securities Sdn Bhd
JMF Asset Management Sdn Bhd
Libra Capital Markets Sdn Bhd
Premier Capital Management Sdn Bhd 
Rashid Hussein Securities Sdn Bhd
Towry Law Asset Management Sdn Bhd
Hwang-DBS Unit Trust Berhad
Merchant Holdings Sdn Bhd
Seacorp-Schroder Capital Management Berhad
Inter-Pacific Portfolio Managers Sdn Bhd
KAF Management Services Sdn Bhd*Mestika Utama Sdn Bhd
Prudential Unit Trust Berhad
Rashid Hussein Asset Management Sdn Bhd
SDB Asset Management Sdn Bhd
TA Unit Trust Management Berhad
Leong & Company Sdn Bhd
Seagroatt & Campbell Sdn Bhd
Pengkalan Securities Sdn Bhd
Bolty Securities Sdn Bhd
Mohaiyani Securities Sdn Bhd 
ShareTech Securities Sdn Bhd 
Labuan Securities Sdn Bhd 
(more to come)

Investment-Link funds (Insurance companies - Takaful included)

8 Life and General Businesses(full list)
AmAssurance Berhad
American International Assurance Co Ltd (AIA)
Hong Leong Assurance Berhad
ING Insurance Berhad
Malaysia National Insurance Berhad (MNI)
Malaysian Assurance Alliance Berhad
MCIS Zurich Insurance Berhad
Prudential Assurance (M) Berhad

8 Life Businesses(full list)
Allianz Life Insurance (Malaysia) Berhad
Asia Life (Malaysia) Berhad
AXA Affin Life Insurance Berhad
Commerce Life Assurance (Malaysia) Berhad
Great Eastern Life Assurance (Malaysia) Berhad
Manulife Insurance (M) Berhad
Mayban Life Assurance Berhad
Uni.Asia Life Assurance Berhad

26 General Businesses(full list)
ACE Synergy Insurance Berhad
Allianz General Insurance Malaysia Berhad
American Home Assurance Company
AMI Insurans Berhad
Asia Insurance (Malaysia) Berhad
AXA Affin General Insurance Berhad
Berjaya General Insurance Berhad
Jerneh Insurance Berhad
Kurnia Insurans (Malaysia) Berhad
Lonpac Insurance Berhad
Mayban General Assurance Berhad
Mitsui Sumitomo Insurance (Malaysia) Berhad (MSIG)
MPI Generali Insurans Berhad (formerly known as Multi-Purpose Insurans Bhd)
MUI Continental Insurance Berhad
Oriental Capital Assurance Berhad
Overseas Assurance Corporation (Malaysia) Berhad
Pacific & Orient Insurance Co. Berhad
Pacific Insurance Berhad, The
PanGlobal Insurance Berhad
Progressive Insurance Berhad
QBE Insurance Berhad
RHB Insurance Berhad
Royal & Sun Alliance Insurance (Malaysia) Berhad
Tahan Insurance Malaysia Berhad
Tokio Marine Insurans (Malaysia) Berhad
Uni.Asia General Insurance Berhad

1 Life and General Reinsurance Businesses (full list)
Hannover Rueckversicherungs AG

1 Life Reinsurance Businesses (full list)
Malaysian Life Reinsurance Group Berhad

4 General Reinsurance Business (full list)
Malaysian Reinsurance Berhad
Munchener Ruckversicherungs-Gesellschaft
Swiss Reinsurance Company
The TOA Reinsurance Company Ltd.

12 Takaful Operators (full list)
Sun Life Takaful
HSBC Amanah Takaful (Malaysia) Sdn Bhd
Etiqa Takaful Berhad
Prudential BSN Takaful Berhad
Syarikat Takaful Malaysia Berhad
Takaful Ikhlas Sdn. Bhd
Takaful Nasional Sdn. Bhd.
Hong Leong MSIG Takaful
Great Eastern Takaful Sdn Bhd
AIA AFG Takaful Berhad
AmMetLife Takaful Berhad
AIA PUBLIC Takaful Berhad
MAA Takaful Berhad

Defunct Insurance companies
Aetna Universal Insurance Berhad
ACE Insurance Limited
AMAL Assurance Berhad
AMI Insurance Berhad
The Asia Insurance Company Limited 
AVIVA Insurance Berhad
AXA Affin Assurance Berhad
Berjaya General Insurance Sdn Bhd
Commerce Assurance Berhad
EON CMG Life Assurance Berhad
Hong Leong Assurance Sdn Bhd
John Hancock Life Insurance Berhad
Industrial &z\ Commercial Insurance Berhad
KSM Insurans Berhad
Kompas Insurans Berhad
London & Pacific Insurance Company Berhad
Malaysia National Reinsurance Berhad
Malaysia Pacific Insurance Berhad (MPI)
Mayban Assurance Berhad
MBA Life Assurance Berhad
MBF Insurans Berhad
MCIS Insurance Berhad
National Employers' Mutual General Insurance Association Limited
The Netherlands Insurance Co. Est 1845 Ltd
The Netherlands Insurance (M) Sdn Bhd
Oriental Capital Assurance Berhad
Overseas Union Insurance Berhad
The Pacific Netherlands Insurance Berhad
Perdana CIGNA Insurance Berhad
People's Insurance Company (M) Berhad
Progressive Insurance Sdn Bhd
South East Insurance Berhad
South East Asia Insurance Berhad
Sri Bumi Insurance Sdn Bhd
Talasco Insurance Berhad
Tenaga Insurance Berhad
The Tokio Marine and Fire Insurance Company
The Tokio Marine and Fire Insurance (M) Sdn Bhd
United Malayan Banking Corporation Insurance Berhad (UMBC Insurance)
United Prime Insurance ( M ) Sdn Bhd
Wing on Fire & marine Insurance
Zurich Insurance (Malaysia) Berhad
(More to come)

See also
Asset management in Malaysia
Bursa Malaysia (Kuala Lumpur Stock Exchange)
Economy of Malaysia
Foreign direct investment
Islamic banking in Malaysia
Malaysian Electronic Payment System
Malaysian Ringgit

References

External links 

 Bank Negara Malaysia |The Central Bank of Malaysia website
 Banking information in Malaysia
 Association of banks in Malaysia
 Securities Commission of Malaysia |Suruhjaya Securiti

Malaysia
Banks
Malaysia